Queenslanapis is a genus of Australian araneomorph spiders in the family Anapidae, containing the single species, Queenslanapis lamington. It was  first described by Norman I. Platnick & Raymond Robert Forster in 1989, and has only been found in Australia.

References

Anapidae
Monotypic Araneomorphae genera
Spiders of Australia
Taxa named by Raymond Robert Forster